Josephine Ophelia Dobbs Clement ( Dobbs; February 9, 1918 – March 23, 1998) was an American politician, teacher, and civil rights activist. She served on the Board of Education of Durham, North Carolina, the first Black woman to do so.

Education and early career
Josephine Ophelia Dobbs was born on February 9, 1918, in Atlanta, Georgia, the fourth of six daughters to civic leader John Wesley Dobbs and Irene Dobbs ( Thompson). She graduated from Spelman College in 1937 and later earned a Master of Arts degree in home economics from Teachers College, Columbia University. Dobbs taught at Morris Brown College and Savannah State College in Georgia. She married William A. Clement in 1941 and moved to Durham, North Carolina in 1946, where she taught at North Carolina Central University.

In the late 1940s, Josephine and William Clement filed lawsuits challenging racial discrimination in schools. Clement and 15 other women leaders in the black community chartered the Durham chapter of the Links, a national service organization, in 1958.

Political career
In 1971, Clement was appointed to a commission that studied the potential consolidation of Durham City and Durham County. The commission's proposed plan for consolidation was rejected in a 1974 referendum.

The Durham City Council appointed Clement to the Durham City Board of Education in 1973. She was the first black woman to serve on the board. In 1975, the city council asked the North Carolina General Assembly to make the school board an elected body; the legislation was passed in June of the same year. Clement was re-elected to the school board in 1975 and 1979, becoming part of the first black-majority school board in North Carolina. In 1978, she became the first black woman to chair the board, and remained in that role for five years.

Clement was appointed to the Durham County Board of Commissioners in 1984. She was elected to the board in November 1984, and served three terms until 1990.

Electoral history

Durham City Board of Education

Durham County Board of Commissioners

Personal life
Josephine Dobbs married William A. Clement on December 24, 1941. William's first wife, Frances, had died of cancer in 1940; they had one daughter, Alexine (born 1936). After they were married, Josephine and William had five children: sons William A. (born 1943), Wesley Dobbs (born 1946), and Arthur John (born 1948), and daughters Kathleen Ophelia (born 1957) and Josephine Millicent.

Death
Clement died of Sjögren syndrome at age 80 on March 23, 1998.

Legacy
The Durham Public Education Network, a nonprofit group, established the Josephine Dobbs Clement Award in 1995. The award is presented annually for "exemplary community leadership in public education".

Josephine Dobbs Clement Early College High School, a partnership between Durham Public Schools and North Carolina Central University, opened in 2004 and is named in Clement's honor. Cecelia Steppe-Jones, former dean of the School of Education at North Carolina Central University, said that in choosing the name of the school, the program's planners "wanted something special—a name of someone who was or had been an advocate for children", and that Clement's name was ultimately selected due to her public education advocacy, social activism, and leadership.

Notes

References

Bibliography

 
 

1918 births
1998 deaths
African-American activists
Activists for African-American civil rights
Activists from Atlanta
African-American people in North Carolina politics
County commissioners in North Carolina
Politicians from Atlanta
Spelman College alumni
Teachers College, Columbia University alumni
School board members in North Carolina
20th-century American politicians
20th-century American women politicians